Polia bombycina (pale shining brown) is a moth of the family Noctuidae. It is found in the Palearctic realm from Ireland to Japan including the Russian Far East and Siberia.

Technical description and variation

The wingspan is 43–52 mm. Forewing pale or dark lilac grey, more or less suffused with grey brown, especially in costal half; a slight dark basal streak below median vein; claviform stigma outlined with black: orbicular and reniform large, paler, with dark centres; reniform with white on outer edge and often followed by a rufous patch; submarginal line preceded by blackish wedge-shaped marks, and acutely indented on submedian fold; hindwing brownish fuscous; — specimens in which the glaucous tint predominates are ab. nitens Haw.; — the much rarer uniformly reddish brown form is unicolor Tutt - flavescens Spul., from the Bukowina, has the forewings pale brownish yellow; — ab. mongolica Stgr. the common form in central and eastern Asia is uniformly darker grey brown with a reddish undertone, the submarginal line equally distinctly indented.

Biology
The moth flies from May to July depending on the location.

Larva pale brown; dorsal line pale; some dark oblique streaks; a whitish dark -mottled lateral line containing the spiracles which are bright red-brown, edged with black. The larvae feed on various herbaceous plants - Betula sp., Alnus incana, Sorbus aucuparia, Prunus padus, Pimpinella saxifraga, Angelica silvestris, Galium verum, Leucanthemum vulgare, Artemisia campestris, Artemesia absinthium, Artemesia vulgaris, Hieracium umbellatum.

References

External links

Pale shining brown on UKmoths
Funet Taxonomy, Subspecies
Lepiforum.de
Vlindernet.nl 

Hadenini
Moths of Japan
Moths of Europe
Moths of Asia
Moths described in 1766
Taxa named by Johann Siegfried Hufnagel